Pai Ligos Kairos is an album by Greek singer Giannis Ploutarhos, released in 2004 by EMI.

Track listing

References 

2003 albums
Giannis Ploutarhos albums